The 2014 Superettan, part of the 2014 Swedish football season, was the 14th season of Superettan, Sweden's second-tier football league in its current format. The 2014 fixtures were released on 20 December 2013. The season started on 5 April 2014 and concluded on 2 November 2014.

Hammarby IF won Superettan this season, their first title and were thus promoted to Allsvenskan after five years absence along with runners-up GIF Sundsvall who returned to the top flight after two years absence. Ljungskile SK advanced to the promotion play-offs but failed to win against Gefle IF.

A total of 16 teams contested the league; 12 returning from the 2013 season, two that were relegated from Allsvenskan and two that were promoted from Division 1.

Teams
A total of 16 teams contested the league, 12 returning from the 2013 season, two relegated from the 2013 Allsvenskan and two promoted from the 2013 Division 1. The top two teams qualified directly for promotion to Allsvenskan, the third had to play a play-off against the fourteenth team from Allsvenskan to decide who would play in Allsvenskan 2015. The bottom two teams qualified directly for relegation to Division 1, the thirteenth and the fourteenth had to play a play-off against the numbers two teams from Division 1 Södra and Division 1 Norra to decide who would play in Superettan 2015.

2013-champions Falkenbergs FF and runner-up Örebro SK were promoted to the Allsvenskan at the end of the 2012 season. They were replaced by Östers IF and Syrianska FC. Örgryte IS and IK Brage were relegated at the end of the 2013 season after finishing in the bottom two places of the table. They were replaced by Division 1 Norra champions IK Sirius and Division 1 Södra champions Husqvarna FF.

Stadia and locations

 1 Correct as of end of 2013 season

Personnel and kits

Note: Flags indicate national team as has been defined under FIFA eligibility rules. Players and Managers may hold more than one non-FIFA nationality.

Managerial changes

League table

Relegation play-offs

IK Frej won 5–3 on aggregate. 

1–1 on aggregate. Assyriska FF won on away goals.

Positions by round

Results

Season statistics

Top scorers

Top assists

Top goalkeepers

(Minimum of 10 games played)

Hat-tricks

See also 
Competitions
 2014 Allsvenskan
 2014 Swedish football Division 1
 2013–14 Svenska Cupen

References

External links 
 Official website 

Superettan seasons
2
Sweden
Sweden